The 1968–69 Algerian Championnat National was the seventh season of the Algerian Championnat National since its establishment in 1962. A total of 16 teams contested the league, with ES Sétif as the defending champions, The Championnat started on September 15, 1968. and ended on June 22, 1969.

Team summaries

Promotion and relegation 
Teams promoted from Algerian Division 2 1968-1969 
 USM Alger
 JS Kabylie

Teams relegated to Algerian Division 2 1969-1970
 ASM Oran
 MC Saïda

League table

Season statistics

Top scorers

References

External links
1968–69 Algerian Championnat National

Algerian Ligue Professionnelle 1 seasons
1968–69 in Algerian football
Algeria